The Wild Hunt is an ancient myth of a spectral or otherworldly hunting party that sometimes appears at night.

Wild Hunt may also refer to:
 
 Liszt's Transcendental Etude No. 8 "Wilde Jagd" ("Wild Hunt")
 Hellboy: The Wild Hunt, the ninth collected edition of the Dark Horse Comics series Hellboy
 The Wild Hunt (film), a 2009 film directed by Alexandre Franchi
 "The Wild Hunt" (Grimm), an episode of Grimm
 The Wild Hunt (The Tallest Man on Earth album), 2010
 The Wild Hunt (Watain album)
 "The Wild Hunt", a track on Therion's Vovin album
 "The Wylde Hunt", a track on Omnia's Crone of War album
 The Witcher 3: Wild Hunt, a 2015 video game

See also
Wild Huntsman (comics)